Franco Udella (born 25 February 1947 in Cagliari) is an Italian former world boxing champion.

Amateur career

Olympic games results 
1968 (as a Light flyweight)
Lost to Alberto Morales (Mexico) 0-5

1972 (as a flyweight)
1st round bye
Defeated Felix Maina (Kenya) 5-0
Lost to Boris Zoriktuyev (Soviet Union) 1-4

Pro career 
Udella turned pro in 1972 and won the newly created WBC light flyweight title in 1975 with a disqualification win over Valentin Martinez in the 12th round. Udella was then stripped of the title in August 1975, for failing to defend against Paraguayan Rafael Lovera, who had never fought a professional fight.  The following year he challenged WBC light flyweight world champion Luis Estaba, but lost by KO in the 3rd round.  He never challenged for a major title again.  He retired in 1979 after a loss to Charlie Magri for the EBU (European) flyweight title.

Professional boxing record

See also 

 List of light-flyweight boxing champions

External links 
 

1947 births
Living people
Flyweight boxers
Light-flyweight boxers
World light-flyweight boxing champions
World Boxing Council champions
Olympic boxers of Italy
Boxers at the 1968 Summer Olympics
Boxers at the 1972 Summer Olympics
Sportspeople from Cagliari
Italian male boxers